Lawrence Charles Lasker (born October 7, 1949) is an American screenwriter and producer who entered American film in 1983 as writer of the movie WarGames.

Biography

Lasker was born in Los Angeles County, California. He is the son of actor Jane Greer and producer Edward Lasker. His paternal grandfather was businessman Albert Lasker and his paternal step-grandmothers were actor Doris Kenyon and Mary Woodard Lasker. He graduated from the Phillips Exeter Academy in 1967 and attended Yale University, as did his father.

Filmography

Also cameo as "Party Guest" in The Other Side of the Wind (2018).

Work nominated for awards
Lasker and Walter F. Parkes were nominated for an Academy Award in screenwriting in 1983 for WarGames. Parkes and he later were nominated for Best Picture of the Year in 1990 for Awakenings.

References

External links

Living people
American male screenwriters
American people of German-Jewish descent
American film producers
Jewish American screenwriters
Phillips Exeter Academy alumni
Yale University alumni
1949 births